= Azhnakin =

Azhnakin (Russian: Ажна́кин; masculine) or Azhnakina (Ажна́кина; feminine) is a Russian last name. A variant of this last name is Azhnin/Azhnina (Ажни́н/Ажнина).

It derives from a patronymic which itself is derived from the nicknames "Ажнака" (Azhnaka) and "Ажня" (Azhnya), which was given to people who overused the word "ажно" (azhno), meaning even, so. It may also be related to the dialectal word "ажнок" (azhnok), meaning a Great Russian from the south, especially from Kaluga.
